Silver Comet may refer to:

Silver Comet (roller coaster), a roller coaster at Martin's Fantasy Island in Grand Island, New York
Silver Comet (train), a passenger train in use from the 1940s to the 1960s
Silver Comet Trail, a multi-use recreational trail in western Georgia